Ángel Antonio Mingote Barrachina, 1st Marquess of Daroca (17 January 19193 April 2012), also simply known as Mingote, was a Spanish cartoonist, writer and journalist. He drew a daily cartoon in ABC since 1953 until his death in 2012.

Biography
He was born in Sitges, Barcelona, Spain.

Honors
On 1 December 2011, Mingote was raised into the Spanish nobility by King Juan Carlos I with the hereditary title of Marquess of Daroca (Spanish: Marqués de Daroca).

Death
He died in Madrid.

Awards
1961 Cruz de Caballero de la Orden de Isabel la Católica
1967 Premio Mingote
1976 Premio Ondas
1979 Premio Juan Palomo, Larra y Víctor de la Serna
1980 Premio Nacional de Periodismo1988 Premio iberoamericano de humor gráfico "Quevedos"1988 Medalla de Oro al Mérito Artístico1989 Premio a la Transparencia (ANFEVI)1995 Medalla de Oro del Ayuntamiento de Madrid1996 Medalla de Oro al Mérito en el Trabajo1997 Cruz de plata de la Guardia civil1998 Cartero Honorario de España1999 Pluma de oro de El Club de la Escritura2001 Premio "Personalidad"2002 Premio Luca de Tena2005 Doctor Honoris Causa por la Universidad de Alcalá de Henares2007 Doctor Honoris Causa por la Universidad Rey Juan CarlosAward Gato PerichGold Medal of Fine ArtsBooks El conde sisebutoHistoria de la genteHistoria de MadridHistoria del trajeHombre soloHombre atónitoHistoria del musLas palmeras de cartónMi primer QuijotePatriotas adosados''

References

External links 
Monografía sobre Mingote
El día que compré 6 kilos de Mingotes

1919 births
2012 deaths
Spanish cartoonists
Members of the Royal Spanish Academy